Diego Castejón Fonseca  (1580 – 19 February 1655) was a Roman Catholic prelate who served as Bishop of Tarazona (1643–1655) and Bishop of Lugo (1634–1636).

Biography
Diego Castejón Fonseca was born in  Madrid, Spain in 1580. On 9 January 1634, he was appointed during the papacy of Pope Urban VIII as Bishop of Lugo. On 2 July 1634, he was consecrated bishop by Melchor Soria Vera, Titular Bishop of Troas, with Miguel Avellán, Titular Bishop of Siriensis, and Timoteo Pérez Vargas, Bishop of Ispahan, serving as co-consecrators. On 1 May 1636, he resigned as Bishop of Lugo. On 28 March 1643, he was selected by the King of Spain and confirmed on 23 May 1644 by Pope Urban VIII as Bishop of Tarazona. He served as Bishop of Tarazona until his death on 19 February 1655.

Episcopal succession

References

External links and additional sources
 (for Chronology of Bishops) 
 (for Chronology of Bishops) 
 (for Chronology of Bishops) 
 (for Chronology of Bishops) 

17th-century Roman Catholic bishops in Spain
Bishops appointed by Pope Urban VIII
1580 births
1655 deaths
Bishops of Tarazona